Wojciech Kondratowicz (born 18 April 1980) is a male hammer thrower from Poland. He set his personal best (81.35 metres) on 13 July 2003 in Bydgoszcz.

Achievements

References
 
 Profile

1980 births
Living people
Polish male hammer throwers
Sportspeople from Gorzów Wielkopolski
Skra Warszawa athletes